This is a list of Iranian football transfers for the 2016 summer transfer window. Transfers of the Persian Gulf Pro League and Azadegan League are listed.

Players limits 

The Iranian Football Clubs who participate in 2015–16 Iranian football different levels are allowed to have up to maximum 35 players in their player lists, which will be categorized in the following groups:
 Up to maximum 18 adult (without any age limit) players
 Up to maximum 9 under-23 players (i.e. the player whose birth is after 1 January 1994).
 Up to maximum 8 under-21 players (i.e. the player whose birth is after 1 January 1996).

Persian Gulf Pro League

Rules and regulations 
According to Iran Football Federation rules for 2016–17 Persian Gulf Pro League, each Football Club is allowed to take up to maximum 6 new Iranian player from the other clubs who already played in the 2015–16 Iran Pro League season. In addition to these six new players, each club is allowed to take up to maximum 4 non-Iranian new players (at least one of them should be Asian) and up to 3 players from Free agent (who did not play in 2015–16 Iran Pro League season or doesn't list in any 2015–16 League after season's start) during the season. In addition to these players, the clubs are also able to take some new under-23 and under-21 years old players, if they have some free place in these categories in their player lists. Under-23 players should sign in transfer window but under-21 can be signed during the first mid-season.

Esteghlal 
Head coach:  Alireza Mansourian
Remaining Pro League quota: 0

In:

Out:

Esteghlal Khuzestan 
Head coach:  Sirous Pourmousavi
Remaining Pro League quota: 4

In:

Out:

Foolad 
Head coach:  Naeim Saadavi
Remaining Pro League quota: 2

In:

Out:

FC Mashhad 
Head coach:  Farhad Kazemi
Remaining Pro League quota: 0

In:

Out:

Gostaresh Foulad 
Head coach:  Faraz Kamalvand
Remaining Pro League quota: 0

In:

Out:

Machine Sazi 
Head coach:  Rasoul Khatibi
Remaining Pro League quota: 0

In:

Out:

Naft Tehran 
Head coach:  Ali Daei
Remaining Pro League quota: 1

In:

Out:

Padideh 
Head coach:  Mohammad Reza Mohajeri
Remaining Pro League quota: 0

In:

Out:

Paykan 
Head coach:  Majid Jalali
Remaining Pro League quota: 0

In:

Out:

Persepolis 
Head coach:  Branko Ivanković
Remaining Pro League quota: 2

In:

Out:

Saba Qom 
Head coach:  Samad Marfavi
Remaining Pro League quota: 1

In:

Out:

Saipa 
Head coach:  Hossein Faraki
Remaining Pro League quota: 1

In:

Out:

Sanat Naft 
Head coach:  Nader Dastneshan
Remaining Pro League quota: 5

In:

Out:

Sepahan 
Head coach:  Abdollah Veisi
Remaining Pro League quota: 1

In:

 

Out:

Tractor Sazi 
Head coach:  Amir Ghalenoei 
Remaining Pro League quota: 1

In:

Out:

Zob Ahan 
Head coach:  Yahya Golmohammadi
Remaining Pro League quota: 4

In:

Out:

Notes
PL Pro League quota.

Azadegan League

Rules and regulations 
According to Iran Football Federation rules for 2016–17 Azadegan League each club is allowed to take up to 3 players from Free agent during the season. In addition to these players, the clubs are also able to take some new under-23 and under-21 years old players, if they have some free place in these categories in their player lists. Under-23 players should sign in transfer window but under-21 can be signed during the first mid-season. Clubs in Azadegan League Couldn't sign any foreign player. There is no limit for signing Iranian players.

Sepidrood 
Head coach:  Ali Nazarmohammadi

In:

Out:

2nd Division

Damash Gilan 
Head coach:

In:

Out:

See also 
 List of Iranian football transfers winter 2014–15
 List of Iranian football transfers summer 2015
 List of Iranian football transfers winter 2015–16
 List of Iranian football transfers winter 2016–17

Notes and references 

Football transfers summer 2016
2016
Transfers